The Kerala State Film Award for Best Costume Designer is an honour, presented annually at the Kerala State Film Awards for the outstanding contribution in a  Malayalam cinema through costume design. The winners are announced by the Minister for Cinema and is handed over by the Chief Minister of Kerala.

Winners

References
Official website
PRD, Govt. of Kerala: Awardees List

Kerala State Film Awards